Zoran Lončar (born 1965) is a Serbian politician. He served as the Minister of Public Administration and Local Self-Government from 2004 to 2007, and as the Minister of Education from 2007 to 2008.

He holds a PhD in Law. In 2000, he joined the Democratic Party of Serbia. He served as a legal adviser in a commission that drafted the Constitutional Charter of Serbia and Montenegro and in the drafting of a new Constitution of Serbia.

Personal life
He is married and has two children.

References 

1965 births
Living people
Politicians from Novi Sad
Government ministers of Serbia
Democratic Party of Serbia politicians
Education ministers of Serbia